Jordi Romeu Robert from the Universitat Politecnica de Catalunya, Barcelona, Spain was named Fellow of the Institute of Electrical and Electronics Engineers (IEEE) in 2012 for contributions to the development of fractal antennas.

References 

Fellow Members of the IEEE
Living people
Year of birth missing (living people)